The 2022 Major League Baseball First-Year Player Draft took place on July 17–19, 2022, in Los Angeles. The draft assigned amateur baseball players to Major League Baseball (MLB) teams. The draft order was based on the reverse order of the 2021 MLB season standings. In addition, compensation picks were distributed for players who did not sign from the 2021 MLB Draft.

Draft order

The order in which teams selected players was based on the reverse order of the final 2021 MLB season standings. The Baltimore Orioles, who had the worst record of the 2021 season, selected Jackson Holliday with the first overall pick in the draft. The New York Mets received the 11th pick as compensation for failing to sign Kumar Rocker. The Boston Red Sox received the 41st pick as compensation for failing to sign Jud Fabian. As a result of reaching the third surcharge tier of the competitive balance tax threshold in 2021, the Los Angeles Dodgers' top pick was moved down 10 slots.

Future changes
On March 10, 2022, MLB and the Major League Baseball Players Association (MLBPA) came to an agreement on a new collective bargaining agreement (CBA). The new CBA instituted a draft lottery beginning with the 2023 MLB draft, with the first six picks being sorted via a lottery for the 18 teams that do not qualify for the postseason. There are limitations on teams participating in the lottery multiple years in a row, with separate limitations for revenue-sharing recipients and revenue-sharing payers. The draft will permanently switch to 20 rounds, with an annual pre-draft combine, and guarantees to draftees of 75% of their slot value provided that they submit to pre-draft physicals. A draft-and-follow option will be re-introduced for players drafted after the 10th round who do not sign before the signing deadline.

Draft selections
The deadline for draftees to sign contracts was August 1, 2022.

First round

Compensatory round

Competitive Balance Round A

Second round

Competitive Balance Round B

Compensatory round

Other notable selections

Notes
Compensation picks

Trades

References

Major League Baseball draft
Draft
Major League Baseball draft
Major League Baseball draft
Major League Baseball draft
Baseball in Los Angeles
Events in Los Angeles